The Central Executive Committee of the Pakistan Peoples Party of Pakistan (Urdu: سنٹرل ایگزیکٹو كميٹى; otherwise known as Core Committee, is an apex and De jure supreme governing authority of Pakistan Peoples Party— a centre-left and democratic socialist political party.  

The central committee directed and supervised all party policies and government activities (if only in power) at central government and provisional level. 

Its executive officer consists of chairman (as well co-chairman at present) and numbers of presidents, vice-presidents, and vice-chairmen.  The central committee may appoints many of the most powerful people in the country, including general-secretaries, presidents, vice-presidents of the party.

In party's hierarchy, the central executive committee is the highest and powerful governing authority and it has final jurisdiction over all the party decision. During the times of Zulfikar Ali Bhutto, it acted as the highest party authority and had control over the enforcement of all economic, scientific, industrial, public and social policies in the country. During the 1980s, it served as the ground base and the ideological headquarter of the Movement for the Restoration of Democracy (MRD) to take down the Islamist military dictatorship of General Zia-ul-Haq.  

The number of its members are vary and the central executive committee does not have any limitations as it goes to the membership of the party. The central committee coordinates activities between Federal Councils and Provisional Presidium and Secretariat Generals at the provisional levels. It is the highest organ of Party's structural leadership and plays a minor role in government policy formations and enforcement. The central executive committee is currently headquartered in the People's Secretariat at the Parliament House.

Central Executive Committee of the Pakistan Peoples Party

The Secretariat-General of the Central Executive Committee is currently headquartered in the People's Secretariat at the Parliament. The central executive committee (CEC) is chaired and directed by an elected and designated chairman (or either co-chairman) who convened all the party meeting at higher level, usually chairman's decision is considered final decision.

References

Pakistan People's Party
Pakistan Peoples Party